Saint-André-Avellin is a municipality located within the Papineau Regional County Municipality in the Outaouais region in western Quebec, Canada. At the 2016 census, it had a population of 3,749 people.

History

It was in 1841 that the first settlers arrived in the townships which Saint-André-Avellin today lies. As being part of a large valley near the Ottawa River, it had agriculture potential but was located very far from the main corridor of the Saint Lawrence River and the main area in which there was significant agriculture development in large townships on both sides of the river between Montreal and Quebec City. Due to the more remote location and the lack of efficient transportation, the development during much of the remainder of the 19th century was fairly slow until several economic crises forced authorities to look for newer land to develop. Throughout most of the century, it was mostly used for the logging industry due to the proximity of extensive forest areas in the higher valleys and hills of the region.

The parish municipality was created in 1851 and it was in 1890, that the first school was built in the area. Population gradually increased, especially during the 1970s by a wave of rural development. The parish and the village that was made official in the second half of the 19th century merged in the late 1990s.

Demographics

Features and festivals

It is one of the major sites of what it is called La Petite-Nation and is the site of two major summer events including the annual Western Rodeo Festival, as well as Musique en Nous, a county-wide event which it presents newer musical talents in the region as well as popular Quebec singers. The town is also home to a theatre and a regional museum related to the history of the Petite-Nation.

Local government
List of former mayors:

 Jean-Denis Lalonde (2002–2005)
 Thérèse Whissell (2005-2017)
 Jean-René Carrière (2017–present)

See also
 List of municipalities in Quebec
 Petite-Nation River

References

External links

 Town's website
 Musique en Nous
 Saint-Andre Avellin Rodeo Festival
 History of Saint-Andre Avellin

Municipalities in Quebec
Incorporated places in Outaouais